Jer or JER may refer to:

Places 
 Pic du Jer, a peak in the Hautes-Pyrénées, France
 JER, abbreviation for Jersey, a British Crown Dependency off the coast of Normandy, France

Language 
 a back yer or jer (ъ), a letter of the Cyrillic alphabet
 jēr, the Gothic alphabet equivalent of jēran, of the j-rune of the Elder Futhark
 jer, ISO 639-3 code for the Jere language, a dialect cluster of Kainji languages in Nigeria

Given name 
 Jeremiah Jer Collison (1890-?), Irish hurler and Gaelic footballer
 Jeremiah Jer Doheny (1874–1929), Irish hurler
 Jeremiah Jer Dwyer (1854-?), Irish hurler
 Jeremy Jer Lau (born 1992), Hong Kong singer
 Jer Norberg (1873-?), Irish hurler
 Gerard Patrick Jer D. O'Connor (born 1940), Irish former Gaelic footballer

Other uses 
 Jer., an abbreviation for the Book of Jeremiah in the Hebrew Bible
 Journal of the Early Republic, a peer-reviewed academic journal which focuses on the early history and culture of the United States from 1776 to 1861
 JER, IATA code for Jersey Airport, on the island of Jersey

Lists of people by nickname
Hypocorisms